Siol nan Gaidheal (meaning "Seed of the Gaels") is a minor Scottish ultranationalist and ethnic nationalist group which describes itself as a "cultural and fraternal organisation".

The first incarnation of the group was founded by Tom Moore in 1978, though it became defunct twice and was re-established by Jackie Stokes in 1987 and again in 1997.

Though the group publicly disavows politics, SnG has been variously described by commentators as anywhere from "traditionalist" to "crypto-fascist" or "proto-fascist". Members of the group have been banned from membership of the mainstream nationalist Scottish National Party since 1982.

Name
The name, properly spelled , is Scottish Gaelic for 'Seed of the Gaels'. The term  has numerous meanings, most commonly translated as "breed, brood, lineage, progeny, seed".

History

First incarnation (19781985)
The first incarnation of Siol nan Gaidheal was founded in 1978 by Tom Moore, a Scot who spent his childhood in the USA. It grew in the immediate aftermath of the 1979 devolution referendum, despite being shunned by the mainstream nationalist SNP, whose ruling executive attempted to ban SnG from the party as early as 1980. In September 1980, the SNP launched an inquiry into the group, with Colin Bell as vice-chairman. SnG was fully proscribed after the SNP's 1982 conference. The 1320 Club, which was banned by the SNP in 1968, merged into SnG in the same year.

Throughout the 1980s, Siol nan Gaidheal published a magazine called  [sic] (Scottish Truth), which has been described as having a rhetoric which was "anti-communist, neo-fascist and sometimes violent in tone". Prime Minister Margaret Thatcher's personal security was stepped up in Scotland after members of SnG tried to accost her outside the Conservative Party conference in Perth in 1982. Some members of SnG formed an unofficial paramilitary wing called  (AnG; "Army of the Gael"), which was responsible for a number of petrol bomb attacks in 1982 and 1983. Against the background of internal division and arrests of members, the first incarnation of Siol nan Gaidheal eventually folded in 1985.

Second incarnation (198790s)

Siol nan Gaidheal was re-established in 1987 by Jackie Stokes, a member of the Scottish Republican Socialist Party. This second incarnation of the group explicitly rejected violence. By 1988, it claimed a membership of 300. Its activities included, in 1989, erecting a cairn in memory of Willie McRae—who was sympathetic to SNG, and possibly at one point a member—along with Michael Strathern. By the early 1990s, however, Stokes had suffered a heart attack and then kidney problems, which effectively killed the organisation.

Third incarnation (1997present)

Jackie Stokes eventually re-established Siol nan Gaidheal for a second time in 1997, this time concentrating mainly on its website and online discussion forum. Chapters were set up in the United States of America and in Canada as a focus for the Scottish diaspora in North America. Stokes died on 24 July 2001, leading to a downturn in the group's activity. In May 2006, SnG held its first Ard Fhèis (party annual conference) in 14 years, in Dalwhinnie, Scotland.

Siol nan Gaidheal actively campaigned during the 2014 independence referendum, though the mainstream Yes Scotland campaign distanced itself from SnG. The group made headlines in the run-up to the referendum for heckling Labour MP Jim Murphy on his visits to Dundee and Montrose.

On 11 January 2020 the All Under One Banner pro-independence demonstration in Glasgow marched behind a banner badged with the Siol nan Gaidheal symbol.

In June 2022, SNP MSP Evelyn Tweed apologised after being photographed holding the flag of Siol nan Gaidheal.

Aim and ideology

The Siol nan Gaidheal website summarises its views as follows:

They have been branded as like "proto fascists" by former SNP leader Gordon Wilson.

See also
Ailtirí na hAiséirghe, an Irish fascist political party active 1942–1958

Footnotes

References 
The Hollow Drum, Arnold Kemp, pp166–172
Britain's Secret War, Andrew Murray Scott and Iain Macleay, pp 113–131.

Notes

External links
Official website

1978 establishments in Scotland
Proto-fascists
Ethnic nationalism
 
Far-right politics in Scotland
Political advocacy groups in Scotland
Scottish nationalist organisations